Microsternarchus bilineatus is a species of bluntnose knifefish that is found in Brazil and Venezuela. This species can reach a length of  TL.

References

Hypopomidae
Fish of South America
Fish of Brazil
Taxa named by Augustín Fernández-Yépez
Fish described in 1968